The 2016–17 Georgia bulldogs basketball team represented the University of Georgia during the 2016–17 NCAA Division I men's basketball season. The team's head coach was Mark Fox, who was in his eighth season at UGA. They played their home games at Stegeman Coliseum as members of the Southeastern Conference. They finished the season 19–15, 9–9 in SEC play to finish in eighth place. They defeated Tennessee in the second round of the SEC tournament to advance to the quarterfinals where they lost to Kentucky. They were invited to the National Invitation Tournament where they lost in the First Round to Belmont.

Previous season
The Bulldogs finished the season 20–14, 10–8 in SEC play to finish in a tie for sixth place. They defeated Mississippi State and South Carolina to advance to the semifinals of the SEC tournament where they lost to Kentucky. They were invited to the National Invitation Tournament where they defeated Belmont in the first round to advance to the second round where they lost to Saint Mary's.

Departures

Incoming transfers

Recruits class of 2016

Recruits class of 2017

Roster

Schedule and results

|-
!colspan=9 style="background:#000000; color:white;"| Exhibition

|-
!colspan=9 style="background:#000000; color:white;"| Regular season

|-
!colspan=9 style="background:#000000; color:white;"| SEC Tournament

|-
!colspan=9 style="background:#000000; color:white;"|  NIT

See also
2016–17 Georgia Lady Bulldogs basketball team

References

Georgia Bulldogs basketball seasons
Georgia
Georgia
Georgia Bulldogs
Georgia Bulldogs